Klaas Bult  (born Marienberg, The Netherlands June 26, 1959) is a Dutch electrical engineer.  He once worked for Broadcom Corporation.

Bult was named a Fellow of the Institute of Electrical and Electronics Engineers (IEEE) in 2014 for his contributions to the design of high frequency analog and mixed signal circuits.

Awards
2020: IEEE Donald O. Pederson Award in Solid-State Circuits

References 

Fellow Members of the IEEE
Living people
Dutch engineers
1959 births